Henry Jacques Garrigues (June 6, 1831July 7, 1913) was a Danish-born American doctor considered to have introduced antiseptic obstetrics to the United States.

Early life and education
Henri Jacques Garrigues was born in Copenhagen, Denmark to the merchant of French Huguenot origin Jacques Louis Garrigue (1789-1854) and his wife Cecile Olivia Duntzfelt (1798-1863), daughter of Danish merchant William Duntzfelt and granddaughter of Frédéric de Coninck. Charlotte Garrigue, the first lady of Czechoslovakia, was his niece. His first cousin was Malvine Garrigues, the noted soprano.

Career
Garrigues graduated from the University of Copenhagen Faculty of Health Sciences with a medical degree in 1869.After graduating, Garrigues moved to the United States where he resided and worked in New York City. He was named an obstetric surgeon at the New York Maternity Hospital and a physician in the Gynecologic Department of the German Dispensary (now Lenox Hill Hospital). In 1877, Garrigues became a fellow of the American Gynecological Society and was made vice president in 1897.

He was responsible for bring aseptic or antiseptic OB/GYN to America in Oct 1 1883.  [Ref:  listed on his tombstone]

Death
On July 7, 1913, Garrigues died at his home in Tryon, North Carolina, aged 82. He is buried in that city.

Bibliography
 Garrigues H.J. (1882) Diagnosis of Ovarian Cysts by Means of the Examination of Their Contents, William Wood, New York City, NY
 (1886) Practical Guide in Antiseptic Midwifery in Hospital and Private Practice, G.S. Davis, Detroit, MI
 (1902) A Textbook of the Science and Art of Obstetrics, J.B. Lippincott, Philadelphia, PA
 (1905) Gynecology, Medical and Surgical, J.B. Lippincott, Philadelphia, PA

References

External links
 

1831 births
1913 deaths
People from Copenhagen
Danish obstetricians
American obstetricians
American medical writers
American male non-fiction writers
American people of Danish descent
People from Tryon, North Carolina